Reinis Zusters  (15 October 1919 – 1999) was a Latvian-born Australian artist. Zusters was a prolific painter, working predominantly in oils, painting many large landscapes, including triptychs of the Blue Mountains. Zusters drew much of his inspiration from the Australian countryside, depicting the colour and form of nature as a rich and vibrant panorama. 

His work is represented in numerous public and private collections in Australia and abroad. His work can be seen at the National Portrait Gallery of Australia, the Art Gallery of New South Wales, and the Auckland Art Gallery Toi o Tāmaki. He won numerous prestigious awards in Australia, Japan and USA and was honoured with the Medal of the Order of Australia in 1994. He was born to Latvian parents in Odessa, Ukraine, and died in his studio in Wentworth Falls, Australia in 1999.

Early life in Europe 

Reinis Zusters was born 15 October 1919 in Odessa, Ukraine, of Latvian parents, Janis and Kristina, in the early years of the Russian Revolution. Zusters’ father was a postmaster in Odessa, but died before he was two years old. His mother sought work in Riga, having put both Reinis and his sister Mirdze into separate orphanages from an early age. Mirdze’s daughter, also Mirdze, later studied to be an artist in Moscow.

Zusters studied Art and Architecture at the Riga Technical College, Latvia, from 1935 to 1940 and took a one year course in anatomy at Riga University. He was influenced by his Latvian cultural heritage and admired the artist Voldemars Tone (1892-1958). He set up a business in Riga designing and making furniture while concentrating on painting and athletics in his spare time. He married Aldija Kapteinis and they had a daughter, Rudita (born 1942 in Riga).

During World War II, Zusters was conscripted into the German army and worked as a war artist from 1942 to 1945, in a group of four men, that included a journalist and photographer, who were sent to document battles and important developments in the war. He and the group spent weeks digging out and burying bodies after the bombing of Dresden. He also survived being torpedoed on a ship in the Baltic Sea.

After World War II, when Russia invaded Latvia, the Zusters family became refugees, living in Oldenburg and Krefeld Displaced Persons camps in Germany for 7 years. He studied art part-time and took the opportunity to visit galleries and museums to study German art.

Early life in Australia 

Zusters, his wife Aldija and daughter Rudita arrived in Australia as Latvian displaced persons in 1950. About 25,000 Latvian refugees migrated to Australia between 1948 and 1951. On landing in Fremantle on 5 January 1950, the family was sent to Northam Migrant Camp and Zusters' first action was to visit the bush with easel and paints. His first trip into the Australian bush was a turning point. It was a marked difference to the landscapes of Europe that his eye was familiar with. Unlike many migrants, he immediately saw the Australian bush as beautiful, rather than harsh. He remained excited and inspired by the wildness of the Australian bush and geology for the rest of his life and they were to be a continuing subject of his explorations.

Zusters stayed in Western Australia for six months, then the family was sent to Cowra Migrant Camp, where his wife and daughter stayed, while he moved to Canberra and became an architectural draughtsman with the Department of Works and Housing in Canberra. He also worked in a timber yard and painted portraits at the nearby Duntroon Royal Military College, painting late into the night after work. In 1951, he held his first solo show in Canberra, with the Art Society of Canberra. He had a second show in Canberra in 1956.

In 1952, Zusters moved with his second wife, Arija Bikse, from Canberra to Pennant Hills in Sydney to help her family build their first home in Australia. Arija's father Karlis Bikse had been a prominent architect in Riga, Latvia and was an inspiration to Reinis. Their daughter Laura was born in Sydney in 1956.

Zusters studied art for two years in the early 1950s at East Sydney Technical College and painted many large portraits including Winston Churchill's gardener John Price Strange, which was purchased by the Art Gallery of New South Wales in 1952, as well as small informal portrait-drawings of friends. Some early portraits are held by the Latvian Society in Strathfield.

Early career in Sydney 

Through his design work, Zusters was appointed Chief Designer with the Australian-American architectural firm Austin-Anderson, at St. Leonards, Sydney, which provided him with the opportunity to travel abroad. In 1960, he designed a new waterfront family home in Arabella St Longueville, on Woodford Bay in Sydney Harbour.

In 1963, Zusters was one of four outstanding local artists appointed to the Lane Cove Art Panel, alongside Lloyd Rees, Bill Pigeon and Guy Warren. The Lane Cove Art Society was formed in 1965 and Zusters was an enthusiastic member for many years until he moved to the Blue Mountains.

From 1968, Zusters quit his job and practised as a full-time professional artist. His cityscapes featured a rich paint surface and sharp-edged thickness of oil paint applied with a palette knife in layers. He painted urban scenes of Sydney, inland Australia and portraits. His usual signature was “Zusters”. Two of his early portraits are in the National Portrait Gallery’s collection – Sir Edgar Coles (1962) and Terry Clune (1960)].

In 1970, Zusters moved to Greenwich. Over the ensuing decades he exhibited regularly in Australia and overseas, holding one man shows at Artarmon Galleries, Darlinghurst Galleries and the South Yarra Gallery. At the Sobot Gallery in Toronto in 1968, he was the first Australian to have a solo exhibition in Canada. He also had a solo exhibition at Gallery Schauman in Essen, Germany in 1965 and at Christchurch New Zealand in 1974.

In the introduction to the catalogue ‘Reinis Zusters’, published in Sydney in 1971, artist Lloyd Rees wrote of his friend's zest for living and 'complete freedom of emotional expression', expressed in work where ‘nature’s forms and colours undergo a magic change and emerge as vital and highly individualistic paintings.’

Blue Mountains 

In 1976, Zusters married his third wife, artist Venita Salnajs, who is also Latvian born, and they moved to Wentworth Falls. Inspired by the mountains, he embarked on a much freer style of richly painted, spattered landscapes and details, capturing the essence and spirit of the Australian landscape and sky.

He often prepared the canvasses for his mountain landscapes in batches, laid out on the grass, splattering backgrounds in the manner of Jackson Pollock and completing with washes and pale glazes of colour. His paintings often featured skies in his distinctive vibrant blue.

He said at the time, “The Blue Mountains lure me. The close-focus and long-range aspects of the landscape present a magical ambiguity and this, coupled with its logs, lichen and moss and perpetual blue sky, totally absorb me.”  

While living in the Blue Mountains and exhibiting at the Holdsworth Galleries, the coffee table book ‘Spiral Vision – Reinis Zusters’ was published in 1981 to showcase his work.

Zusters exhibited at the Lewers Bequest and Penrith Regional Gallery and Ozartspace Katoomba, among many others. Blue Mountains City Council purchased several of his works and architect Nigel Bell designed the Conservation Hut in Wentworth Falls, which was built to house and display several of his larger paintings.

Zusters remained in the Blue Mountains for the rest of his life, living in his home ‘Jamieson’, near the Falls and Darwin’s Walk. He died on 8 October 1999 in his favourite painting chair in his studio at Wentworth Falls, one week short of his 80th birthday. He was buried in the Latvian section of Rookwood Cemetery, Sydney.

Honors and awards 
Zusters’ work is represented in numerous public and private collections in Australia and overseas. He won several prestigious awards in Australia, USA and Japan, the latter being the Bronze Prize in the 1990 Osaka Triennale’90 and the Special Prize at the Osaka Triennale’93 in 1993. He achieved his win from over 29,000 artists competing from 81 countries.

He won the Daily Telegraph Art Prize in 1957 and the Hunters Hill prize in 1958 and 1959. In 1959, Zusters took the Wynne Prize for Landscape, then the Rockdale Prize in 1962, the Crouch Prize, Bendigo Art Gallery in 1963 and the Mosman Art Prize, 1971. His portrait of potter Peter Rushforth was exhibited in Portraits of Australia: The Doug Moran National Portrait Prize Collection in 1988. In 1994, he was honored with the Order of Australia Medal.

Birth of a Nation and other murals 
For the Australian Bicentenary in 1988, Zusters completed his grandest work – a series of massive epic panels entitled The Birth of a Nation. Thirteen huge paintings consisted of 42 smaller and 34 large panels, depicting his interpretation of Australia’s development since the Aborigines first encountered white men in 1788. His wife Venita described them as “a kind of psalm-devotional and a hymn of praise to everything Australian". Birth of a Nation was exhibited at the newly opened Parramatta Cultural Centre, now called the Riverside Theatre. The Centre still holds some of these panels.

His other murals include Man's Struggle for Identity in Trans City House, Sydney and a World War II memorial in Christchurch Cathedral, Newcastle, after winning the competition to paint it.

Solo exhibitions 

1999 Ozartspace, Katoomba, NSW
1994 Holdsworth Galleries, Sydney
1992 Holdsworth Galleries, Sydney
1988 Australian Bicentennial Project, Birth of a Nation, City of Parramatta Cultural Centre, City of the Blue Mountains Civic Centre, and Holdsworth Galleries, Sydney
1987, Holdsworth Galleries, Sydney
1984 Reinis Zusters Survey Exhibition, The Lewers Bequest and Penrith Regional Art Gallery, Sydney
1981 Book launch of Spiral Vision and exhibition, Holdsworth Galleries, Sydney
1981 Trinity Society of Arts: Reinis Zusters Tribute Exhibition, Delmar Gallery Sydney
1978 Adelaide Arts Festival, David Sumner Galleries, Adelaide, SA
1977 Royal Easter Show Art Prize Exhibition, Sydney Showground, Sydney
1974 C.S.A. Gallery, Canterbury Society of Arts, Christchurch, New Zealand
1971 South Yarra Gallery, Melbourne
1968 Sobot Galleries, Toronto, Canada
1967 South Yarra Gallery, Melbourne
1967 Darlinghurst Galleries, Sydney, opened by Lloyd Rees
1966 White Studio Gallery, Adelaide
1966 Darlinghurst Galleries, Sydney
1965 Gallerie Schaumann, Essen, Germany
1965 Dominion Gallery, Sydney
1964 South Yarra Gallery, Melbourne
1963 Artarmon Galleries, Sydney
1961 Terry Clune Galleries, Sydney
1956 Artists’ Society of Canberra, Canberra, ACT
1951 Artists’ Society of Canberra, Canberra, ACT

Important group exhibitions 

1996 Osaka Triennale 1996, Osaka Japan
1996 Two Worlds One Sky, joint exhibition with wife Venita Salnajs at Lewers Bequest and Penrith Regional Art Gallery and at the National Art Museum, Riga, Latvia
1993 Osaka Triennale, Osaka Japan
1990 Osaka Triennale 1990, Mydome Osaka, Osaka, Japan
1990–1991 Latvian Artists – Side by Side, High Court of Australia, Canberra, ACT
1990–1991 A Regional Response, Lewers Bequest & Penrith Regional Art Gallery, Sydney
1990 The General Exhibition of Latvian Art, Riga Latvia
1989 Lloyd Rees and Friends, Von Bertouch Galleries 26th Anniversary Exhibition, Newcastle, NSW
1988 The Artist and Lane Cove, Bicentennial Exhibition of Celebrated Lane Cove Artists, Lane Cove Civic Centre, Sydney
1965 Reinis Zusters and William Peascod Exhibition, Dominion Galleries, Sydney
1963 Australian Art, National Art Gallery, Kuala Lumpur, Malaysia
1960 Australian Artists Exhibitions, France & USA

Awards and prizes 

1996 Television Osaka Inc. Prize
1994 Order of Australia Medal (OAM), Australian Federal Government
1993 Habikino City Prize, Osaka Triennale’93, Japan (International Triennial Competition of Painting)
1990 Bronze Prize, Osaka Triennale’90, Japan (International Triennial Competition of Painting)
1988 Honorary Recognition Prize for Birth of a Nation Bicentennial Project, Free Latvian Cultural Foundation, USA
1988 Special Bicentennial Citizen Award, Council of the City of the Blue Mountains NSW
1981 Newcastle Cathedral Memorial Design Competition, Newcastle NSW
1980 McGregor Art Prize, Darling Downs Institute of Advanced Education, Toowoomba Queensland
1979 Eltham Art Prize, Melbourne
1972 Mosman Art Prize, Mosman Art Gallery, NSW
1963 Crouch Art Prize, Bendigo Art Gallery, Victoria
1962 Rockdale Art Prize, Sydney
1960 Winner of Wynne Prize for Landscape
1959 Wynne Prize for Landscape, Art Gallery of NSW (for Harbour Cruise)
1958/59 Hunters Hill Art Prize, Sydney
1957 Daily Telegraph Art Prize, Sydney
1952 Metro-Goldwyn-Mayer Art Prize, Canberra

Major commissions 

1987 Foyer Mural Sydney Harbour, CCH Australia, North Ryde, Sydney
1986 Church Mural Saints, Church of Our Lady Presbytery, South Blacktown, Sydney
1985 Church Mural Christening of the Croatians, Church of Our Lady Presbytery,   South Blacktown, Sydney
1983 Historical Mural Parramatta, McNamara Group of Companies
1983 Foyer Mural Man’s Struggle for Identity, Trans City House, City Freeholds, Sydney
1982 War Memorial Mural, Christchurch Cathedral, Newcastle
1973 Design of gold/silver plate for opening of the Sydney Opera House
1965 Foyer Mosaic Mural, Sydney Rebirth, Goldfields House, Circular Quay, Sydney
1952 Historical Painting, Royal Military College, Duntroon Canberra

Australian representations 

Art Gallery of New South Wales, Sydney
Art Gallery of South Australia, Adelaide
Art Gallery of Western Australia, Perth
Australian National Gallery, Canberra
Australian National Portrait Gallery, Canberra
Australian National University, Canberra
Bendigo Art Gallery, Victoria
Commonwealth Collection, Canberra
Lewers Bequest and Penrith Regional Art Gallery, Sydney
Museum and Art Gallery of the Northern Territory, Darwin
Queensland Art Gallery, Brisbane
Rockhampton Art Gallery, Queensland
Tasmanian Museum and Art Gallery, Hobart
Wagga Wagga City Art Gallery, NSW
City of the Blue Mountains Art Collection, NSW
Wellington National Gallery, New Zealand, now Museum of New Zealand
Christchurch Art Gallery, New Zealand
National Museum of Art, Riga, Latvia
National Gallery, Kuala Lumpur
Government Collection, Malaysia
Dunedin Public Art Gallery, Dunedin, New Zealand
Contemporary Art and Cultural Centre, Osaka, Japan
University of New South Wales
University of Southern Queensland, Toowoomba
Downlands College Art Collection, Toowoomba
The Shire of Eltham Collection, Victoria
City of Parramatta Art Collection, NSW
Warringah Collection, Manly
Royal Military College, Duntroon Canberra
Reserve Bank Collection, Sydney
USA Embassy Collection, Canberra
G.J. Coles Collection, Melbourne
Travelodge Art Collection, Sydney
Trinity Grammar School Collection, Sydney
Shell Oil Company Collection, Melbourne
World Trade Centre, Sydney

References and publications 
 Zusters, Reinis (1981), 'Spiral Vision’, Bay Books, Sydney and London.
 Anon (1979), 'Latvian Artists in Australia’, Compiled, written and published by Society of Latvian Artists in Australia (A.L.M.A.), Sydney, NSW.
 'Reinis Zusters’ (1971) Author Lloyd Rees, Collins Australian Artists Editions, Sydney, NSW and London, England.
 ‘Art Folios’ (1972) 12 Australian Paintings in the Art Gallery of New South Wales, Paul Milton, Heinemann, Melbourne
 ‘Artists and Galleries of Australia and New Zealand (1975), Max Germain, Lansdowne Editions, Sydney
 Speirs, Hugh (1981), 'Landscape Art and the Blue Mountains’, Alternative Publishing Co-operative, Sydney, NSW.
 Germaine, Max (1975), 'Artists and Galleries of Australia and New Zealand’, Lansdowne Editions, Sydney, NSW.
 McGillick, Paul (2000), 'Tributes: Reinis Zusters’, Volume 38, Number 1 (Spring), p 68. Art & Australia, Sydney, NSW.
 Milton, Paul (1972), 'Art Folios – 12 Australian Paintings in the Art Gallery of NSW’, Heinemann, Melbourne, VIC.
 Washington, Judy (1989), 'Artists of Lane Cove’, Lane Cove Public Library, Sydney, NSW.
 Zusters, Reinis (1988), 'The Birth of a Nation,’, Australian Bicentennial Authority, Sydney, NSW.
 ‘Two Worlds – One Sky’, (1995/6) Reinis Zusters and Venita Salnajs, catalogue Lewers Bequest and Penrith Regional Art Gallery, Sydney
 Osaka Triennale’90, catalogue, pg 74
 'Obituary’, no. 126, p. 40, Art Monthly Australia, December 1999
 'Obituary’, p. 20, Sydney Morning Herald, 19 October 1999
 Tributes: Reinis Zusters, Art & Australia Vol. 38 No. 1, p. 68 (2000) Paul McGillick
 Design and Art Australia Online
 Gauja, Martins (2000), 'Obituary’, Maksla, (Latvian: Art) USA
 'Zusters, Reinis (1981) Spiral Vision. Bay Books, Sydney, NSW'.
 Fred Rost, author, artist, Emeritus Professor in University of NSW
 Wife Venita Salnajs, artist, Sydney
 Daughters Laura Zusters, Sydney, and Rudita Leverington, Canberra

References

External link

1919 births
1999 deaths
20th-century Australian artists
Latvian emigrants to Australia
Latvian painters
Australian painters
Artists from Odesa
Recipients of the Medal of the Order of Australia